Robert Dowhan (born 14 July 1967) is a Polish politician. He was elected to the Senate of Poland (10th term) representing the constituency of Zielona Góra. He was also elected to the 8th term (2011–2015) and 9th term (2015–2019) of the Senate of Poland.

References 

Living people
1967 births
Place of birth missing (living people)
20th-century Polish politicians
21st-century Polish politicians
Members of the Senate of Poland 2011–2015
Members of the Senate of Poland 2015–2019
Members of the Senate of Poland 2019–2023